Road is a 2002 Indian Hindi-language road thriller film produced by Ram Gopal Varma and directed by Rajat Mukherjee, starring Manoj Bajpayee, Vivek Oberoi and Antara Mali. An eloped couple Arvind (Vivek Oberoi) and Lakshmi (Antara Mali), en route Delhi to Jodhpur on a deserted highway, encounter a mad wayfarer (Vijay Raaz), a Hitchhiker  Babu (Manoj Bajpayee) who turns out to be a serial psychopath killer, Inderpal (Makrand Deshpande) a happy go lucky, intelligent, responsible truck driver and an irresponsible, eccentric cop (Sayaji Shinde).

Plot
Arvind (Vivek Oberoi) and Lakshmi (Antara Mali) are in love and want to get married. However, Lakshmi's dad, a cop, is against their affair. Hence the two decide to elope from Delhi and travel to get married at Arvind's ancestral haveli in Rajgarh, Alwar, Rajasthan, by road, passing by a desert, in a Tata Safari.

After an escape from an aggravated assault, by a mad wayfarer, they bump into a smooth-talking hitchhiker Babu (Manoj Bajpayee), who is stranded in the middle of nowhere. Babu convinces the young couple to give him a lift. Travelling with Babu proves a nightmare for Arvind and Lakshmi, Babu turns out to be a psychopath. Soon, Lakshmi finds herself hostage of an armed Babu. Thanks to the timely intervention of a truck driver Inderpal (Makrand Deshpande) and the highway petrol bunk owner, an aspiring actor Bhanwar Singh (Rajpal Yadav), Arvind rescues Lakshmi from Babu.

After a while, Babu again finds a way, after attacking Inderpal, and re-attacks the couple by haunting them on the road, via Inderpal's truck. But, this time, Babu fails to get hold of the couple. After lodging an FIR, in the nearest police station, the couple finds a motel, the couple recuperate. The next day Babu again attacks the couple and elopes with Lakshmi.

When the car breaks down on the way, Babu kills his another victim, a traveler (Snehal Dabi) attracted to Lakshmi, and elopes in the traveler's vehicle. As the cops are on their way to catch hold of him, he manages to dodge them.

On the other hand, the cops suspect Arvind as the serial killer, as he first eloped with Lakshmi, who is D.C.P's daughter. This irresponsible intervention of the cop (Sayaji Shinde), who fail to trust Arvind, makes it impossible to chase Lakshmi. Finally, a frustrated Arvind, manages to escape with the cops jeep. The full focus of the police is now on Arvind as they believe him to have committed a murder and dumped the body in a car and that the story of Babu and Lakshmi is a fabrication. Arvind manages to flee to a small bar where he reunites with Inderpal. He and Inderpal now try to track Babu down with the help of Inderpal's truck but are spotted by the police who give a chase. Inderpal is injured in the gunfight and Arvind drives him to a hospital.

Meanwhile, Babu forces his way into a bungalow by attacking its caretaker while the owner was away. At the bungalow, Lakshmi begins to show signs that she is on Babu's side. The caretaker of the house is tied up but manages to call the police on Babu. At the same time, the police also find Arvind's vehicle and in it, a photograph of himself and Lakshmi, indicating that Arvind is innocent and was telling the truth. At the hospital, Arvind has an encounter with the police and overcomes a cop and is about to tie him up when that cop gets informed through the radio that Arvind is innocent.

The police reach the bungalow the following morning where Babu kills two policemen before escaping. Arvind, finally having his name cleared, joins the police in chasing down Babu. He takes control of a police bike after its rider was shot down by Babu. Arvind chases Babu into the desert where the vehicle breaks down again. Babu and Lakshmi get out of the car and Arvind too gets off his bike and starts coming for Babu. Babu tells Lakshmi that there is only one bullet left in the gun and that will kill Arvind. However, just as he is about to shoot, Lakshmi attacks Babu, causing the last bullet to miss. Arvind takes advantage of the distraction and attacks Babu. Arvind badly beats Babu and the couple, reunited, leave Babu to die in the desert and continue on their journey on the police bike.

Cast
Vivek Oberoi as Arvind Chauhan
Antara Mali as Lakshmi
Manoj Bajpayee as Babu
Sayaji Shinde as Inspector Singh
Vijay Raaz as Villager on the road
Snehal Dabi as Traveler on the road
Makrand Deshpande as Inderpal
Ganesh Yadav as Bungalow watchman
Rajpal Yadav as Bhanwar Singh
Raj Zutshi as Kishan bhai
Koena Mitra as special appearance in item number "Khullam Khulla"

Soundtrack
"Road Ke Har Mod Pe": Gary Lawyer & Tannishtha
"Makhmali Yeh Badan": Sanjeevani & Sonu Nigam
"Raste Raste": Sunidhi Chauhan & Vinod Rathod
"Khullam Khulla Pyaar": Sonu Nigam & Sunidhi Chauhan
"Toofan Sa Zor Hai Hum Mein": Sunidhi Chauhan & KK
"Pehli Nazar Mein": Mohit Chauhan & Sunidhi Chauhan
"Road Rage": Instrumental

References

External links

2000s Hindi-language films
Indian road movies
Films set in Rajasthan
Films shot in Rajasthan
Indian thriller films
2000s road movies
2002 films
Films scored by Sandeep Chowta
Indian neo-noir films
Indian drama road movies
2002 thriller films
Hindi-language thriller films